Dimitri Liénard (born 13 February 1988) is a French professional footballer who plays for and captains Ligue 1 side Strasbourg. He plays as a midfielder or as a winger.

References

1988 births
Living people
Association football midfielders
Association football wingers
French footballers
Ligue 1 players
Ligue 2 players
Championnat National players
FC Mulhouse players
RC Strasbourg Alsace players